An interlanguage is an emerging language system in the mind of a second language learner.

Interlanguage or interlingual may also refer to:

 Interlanguage, a term in interlinguistics referring to any language used between people who cannot communicate by means of their first languages
 Interlanguage, a synonym for pivot language, an intermediary language used as a tool for translation between many different languages

See also

Interlingua